The Battle of Gibraltar may refer to:
 Battle of the Strait of Gibraltar, a naval battle of 1591
 Battle of Gibraltar (1607), a naval battle during the Eighty Years' War
 Battle of Gibraltar (1618), a minor naval battle during the Eighty Years' War
 Battle of Gibraltar (1621), a naval battle during the Eighty Years' War
 Capture of Gibraltar, a 1704 engagement during the War of the Spanish Succession

See also
 List of sieges of Gibraltar